Stefan Spirovski (born 23 August 1990) is a Macedonian professional footballer who plays as a midfielder for Armenian Premier League club Pyunik and the North Macedonia national team.

Career
Born in Bitola, SR Macedonia, he played for FK Pelister in the Macedonian First League between 2007 and 2009. He signed with Borac Čačak in the winter break of the 2009–10 season and has played regularly with Borac for the following two and a half seasons. At the end of the 2011–12 season, Borac ended unexpectedly relegated to the Serbian First League and in August 2012 he was loaned to Macedonian top flight side FK Rabotnički. In 2014 he joined Beroe. In January 2015 Vardar bought him from Beroe.

On 6 September 2019 signed to Hapoel Tel Aviv

Ferencváros
On 16 June 2020, he became champion with Ferencváros by beating Budapest Honvéd FC at the Hidegkuti Nándor Stadion on the 30th match day of the 2019–20 Nemzeti Bajnokság I season.

International career
Spirovski was part of the Macedonia national under-21 football team. In the past he was part of the U-19 and U-17 teams as well.

On 10 August 2011, he made his debut for the Macedonian national team in a friendly match against Azerbaijan. As of April 2020, he has earned a total of 31 caps, scoring 1 goal.

Career statistics

Club

International goals

Honours

Club
Borac Čačak
Serbian Cup runner-up: 2011–12

Vardar
Macedonian First League: 2014–15, 2015–16, 2016–17
Macedonian Super Cup: 2015

Individual
 Macedonian player of the year: 2016–17

References

External links
 Profile at Macedonian Football 
 Stefan Spirovski at Utakmica.rs  
 
 

1990 births
Living people
Sportspeople from Bitola
Association football midfielders
Macedonian footballers
North Macedonia youth international footballers
North Macedonia under-21 international footballers
North Macedonia international footballers
FK Pelister players
FK Borac Čačak players
FK Rabotnički players
PFC Beroe Stara Zagora players
FK Vardar players
Ferencvárosi TC footballers
Hapoel Tel Aviv F.C. players
AEK Larnaca FC players
FC Mariupol players
MTK Budapest FC players
Macedonian First Football League players
Serbian SuperLiga players
First Professional Football League (Bulgaria) players
Nemzeti Bajnokság I players
Israeli Premier League players
Ukrainian Premier League players
UEFA Euro 2020 players
Macedonian expatriate footballers
Expatriate footballers in Serbia
Expatriate footballers in Bulgaria
Expatriate footballers in Hungary
Expatriate footballers in Israel
Expatriate footballers in Cyprus
Expatriate footballers in Ukraine
Macedonian expatriate sportspeople in Ukraine
Macedonian expatriate sportspeople in Serbia
Macedonian expatriate sportspeople in Bulgaria
Macedonian expatriate sportspeople in Hungary
Macedonian expatriate sportspeople in Israel
Macedonian expatriate sportspeople in Cyprus